Yuya Sato may refer to:

, Japanese footballer
, Japanese writer